List of programs broadcast by Canal 9



0–9

A

B

C

F

G

H

I

L

M

P

U

V

z

References

Lists of television series by network
Programs